Lion Schuster (born 9 August 2000) is an Austrian professional footballer who plays as a midfielder for Austrian Bundesliga club Rapid Wien.

Club career
A youth product of Rapid Wien since 2012, Schuster signed a professional contract with the team on 14 August 2020. Schuster made his professional debut with Rapid Wien in a 2-1 Austrian Cup loss to FC Red Bull Salzburg on 25 September 2019.

Career statistics

References

External links
 
 OEFB Profile
 OEFB NT Profile

2000 births
Living people
Footballers from Vienna
Austrian footballers
Austria youth international footballers
SK Rapid Wien players
Austrian Football Bundesliga players
Austrian Regionalliga players
Association football midfielders